"Summum Bonum" is a poem by Robert Browning. It was published in poet's last book, Asolando in 1889. It is a short poem or epigram. The title is a Latin phrase that means the highest good.

Form 
The poem is composed of eight lines. They are not equally long. Some are fifteen syllables long, while others are only six syllables long. The metre is anapaestic. The longer lines are built of five feet:
 x x / x x / x x / x x / x x /
and the shorter of only two feet:
 x x / x x /
while Browning frequently employs what might be considered cretic substitutions:

   /    x     /      /   x     /     /  x    /
 Breath and bloom, shade and shine, wonder, wealth...

The lines rhyme according to the scheme ABABBCAC and also feature alliteration.

Text

Critical reception 
A Polish sociologist, Leon Winiarski, who was active at the end of the 19th century, was disgusted with the poem. In his view, Browning should not have written it, writing: "We have to laugh, when we read that this eighty-year-old man standing at the edge of a grave thinks that the greatest happiness in life is in 'kissing a girl'."

References

Bibliography 
 Robert Browning, Asolando: fancies and facts, London 1890.

Poetry by Robert Browning
1889 poems